The Satellite Award for Best Original Score is an annual award given by the International Press Academy. Hans Zimmer is both the most awarded and the most nominated composer in this category, with five wins and ten nominations.

Winners and nominees

1990s

2000s

2010s

2020s

References

External links	
 Official website

Score Original